Yasin Arafat (born 7 July 1987) is a Bangladeshi cricketer who has played first-class and List A cricket. He is a right-handed batsman and off break bowler. He made his debut for Chittagong Division in 2003/04.

References

Bangladeshi cricketers
Chittagong Division cricketers
Living people
Bangladesh East Zone cricketers
1987 births
People from Chittagong